Ferdinand Frédéric "Fred" Barlow (2 October 1881 – 3 January 1951) was a 20th-century French classical composer.

Fred Barlow started music at age 28 and studied with Charles Koechlin in Paris.

In 1926, he joined the Quakers, an engagement which had influence on his music.

Selected works 
 Sylvie ou Le Double Amour, opéra comique, libretto by Pierre Bettin after Gérard de Nerval, created in 1923 in Paris 
 Mam'zelle Prud'homme, operetta, libretto by C. Bével, created in 1932 in Monte-Carlo 
 La Grande Jatte, ballet, accepted at the Opera in 1939 and created during the sommer 1950.

References

Bibliography 

French male classical composers
French opera composers
Male opera composers
French operetta composers
French ballet composers
French Quakers
ETH Zurich alumni
1881 births
Musicians from Mulhouse
1951 deaths
Converts to Quakerism from Roman Catholicism
20th-century Quakers
20th-century French composers
20th-century French male musicians